New Faces was an Australian talent show that preceded the British show of the same name, produced at GTV-9 Melbourne. The program began in 1963 under the name Kevin Dennis Auditions, sponsored by the new car dealership, Kevin Dennis Motors, which was run by Kevin Dennis (Dennis Gowing), who was also a well known face on Australian TV from his catchy 'Update' TV Commercials in the 1960s–70s, which were featured during the breaks of the popular show.  The program ran on Saturday mornings. The program name soon changed to Kevin Dennis New Faces, and later simply New Faces, becoming a Sunday night prime time show.

The program began as a vehicle for rags-to-riches Melbourne businessman, Kevin Dennis, to promote his business.  Australian journalist Derryn Hinch, in remembering Kevin Dennis said: 

Originally hosted by Frank Wilson from 1963 to 1976, and then by Bert Newton from 1976 to 1985, the show featured two serious judges, such as Bobby Limb, Geoff Brooke, Rod McLennan and Tim Evans. Contestants would compete in heats, with the winners competing in finals. Many of its contestants later became famous, including Daryl Somers, Paul Hogan, The Hawking Brothers, Col Elliott, Julia Morris and Keith Urban.

Contestants and winners
The Spinning Wheels Contestants; later recorded for HMV and had a number of records in the charts 1964
Liv Maessen Heat winner and Runner-up 1969
Daryl Somers Grand Final Runner up 1970
John Williamson Grand Final Winner 1970
Susie Coles Grand Final Winner 1971
Mike and Keith Webb Grand Final Winners (SAS-10 Adelaide)  1971
Shane Bourne Heat Winner 1972
Col Elliott Grand Final Winner 1973
Rave (Shepparton pop band) Grand Final Winners 1972
Paul Hogan contestant 1971
Maria Mercedes contestant 1973
Lyn Bryant (now Billie Wilde) Grand Final Winner 1976
Debby Jean (Baker) Grand Final Winner 1977
Martin Lass Grand Final Winner 1982
Keith Urban Contestant 1983
Michelle French Grand Final Winner 1984
Peter Andre Offered record deal on live TV auditions 1990
Jerson Trinidad Grand Final Winner  1993

Revivals
From 1989 Daryl Somers hosted and produced the program on GTV-9. In 1992, Bert Newton hosted the program on Network Ten, running until 1993.

See also

 List of Australian music television shows

References

External links 
 

1960s Australian game shows
1970s Australian game shows
1980s Australian game shows
1990s Australian game shows
1963 Australian television series debuts
1985 Australian television series endings
1992 Australian television series debuts
1993 Australian television series endings
Australian variety television shows
Black-and-white Australian television shows
Network 10 original programming
Nine Network original programming
Talent shows